Love and Honor is a 2013 romantic drama film directed by Danny Mooney. It is Mooney's feature-film directorial debut. The film, based on a true story of a Michigan soldier, takes place during the Vietnam War and is set in Ann Arbor and surrounding areas. The story follows a soldier who, after being dumped by his girlfriend, decides to return home secretly from war with his best friend to win her back.

Plot
In 1969, at the time of the Apollo 11 mission, American soldier Dalton Joiner, fighting in the Vietnam War, uses his time of R&R supposed to be spent in Hong Kong, to fly back to the United States to re-capture the heart of his girlfriend Jane. Fellow soldier Mickey Wright accompanies him. Jane now calls herself Juniper, and is a member of a group of anti-war activists. Joiner and Wright pretend they are AWOL, and are admired by the group for that, until it is revealed that they plan to return in time. Juniper breaks up (again) with Joiner, which makes him decide to flee to Canada. Wright falls in love with Candace, but returns to Vietnam.

Cast
Liam Hemsworth as Mickey Wright
Austin Stowell as Dalton Joiner
Aimee Teegarden as Juniper / Jane
Teresa Palmer as Candace
Chris Lowell as Peter Goose
Max Adler as Burns
Wyatt Russell as Topher Lincoln
Delvon Roe as Isaac

Production
The film was shot in and around Ann Arbor, Michigan from July 11 to August 12, 2011. A scene was also filmed in Ypsilanti, Michigan.

The international sales rights were acquired by Lighting Entertainment in May 2012. Lighting Entertainment intended to premiere the film for international buyers at the Cannes Film Market held in May 2012.

See also
"Jennifer Juniper"

References

External links

2013 films
2013 romantic drama films
American romantic drama films
Films scored by Alex Heffes
Films set in 1969
Films set in Michigan
Films shot in Michigan
American war films
2013 directorial debut films
2010s English-language films
2010s American films